Güenoa is a sparsely documented, extinct Charruan language once spoken in Uruguay and Argentina.

Text sample
Güenoa is known from a short 18th-century catechesis quoted by Lorenzo Hervás y Panduro in Italian. The text sample below, originally from Hervás y Panduro (1787: 229), has been reproduced from Vignati (1940).Vignati, Milcíades A. 1940. El catecismo Güenoa del Abate Hervás. Notas del Museo de la Plata: Antropología 5: 41-43.

See also
Güenoa people
Charruan languages
Charrúa people

References

Charruan languages
Extinct languages of South America
Chaco linguistic area